The Society for the Relief of Russian Exiles was an international organization established following the Bolshevik Revolution in Russia to support the large number of White émigrés who fled that country during the Russian Civil War.

References
 "The Russian Relief and a Hospital Unit Lay Plans", The New York Times. December 29, 1929. Page 13X. 
 "Dance to recall Easter in Russia", The New York Times. April 12, 1936. Page N3.

White Russian emigration
Russian diaspora